Engola is a surname. Notable people with the surname include:

Charles Engola (born 1958), Ugandan politician and retired colonel 
Jean Jospin Engola (born 1997), Cameroonian footballer 
Sam Engola (born 1958), Ugandan businessman and politician

Surnames of African origin